A list of fellows of the Royal Society elected in 1972.

Fellows 

 Murray Llewellyn Barr
 John Stewart Bell
 Bryan John Birch
 David Mervyn Blow
 George Bond
 Gustav Victor Rudolf Born
 Samuel Francis Boys
 William Bullerwell
 Denis Parsons Burkitt
 Vernon Ellis Cosslett
 Alexander Dalgarno
 Francis Farley
 Geoffrey Fryer
 Raymond Michael Gaze
 Victor Gold
 Sir John Archibald Browne Gray
 Alexander John Haddow
 David Keynes Hill
 Sir John T. Houghton
 Andrew Keller
 Hermann Lehmann
 Sir Morien Morgan
 William David Ollis
 Benjamin Peary Pal
 Mary Parke
 Sir Roger Penrose
 Gordon Hindle Rawcliffe
 Alfred Edward Ringwood
 Max Rosenheim, Baron Rosenheim
 Ruth Ann Sanger
 Fritz Joseph Ursell
 Robert Joseph Paton Williams
 Christopher Alwyne Jack Young

Foreign members 

 Johannes Martin Bijvoet
 Kenneth Stewart Cole
 William Maurice Ewing
 Luis Federico Leloir

References

1972
1972 in science
1972 in the United Kingdom